Gerard I may refer to:

 Gerard I, Count of Guelders
 Gerard I of Isenburg-Kempenich
 Gerard I of Durbuy

See also
Girard I of Roussillon